Pasiphilodes luteata is a moth in the family Geometridae. It is found on Borneo.

The forewings have a pale golden-yellow ground colour with vinous-brown markings.

References

Moths described in 1976
Eupitheciini